Off Camera is an American interview-based television series, magazine and podcast. It was created by photographer and director Sam Jones, who is also the host. Off Camera airs on DirecTV's Audience channel 239, with a twelfth season as of August 19, 2019.
 
Jones created the show out of his passion for the long-form conversational interview, and as a way to share his conversations with a myriad of artists, actors, musicians, directors, skateboarders, photographers and writers that pique his interest. Interviewees featured on Off Camera have included Dave Grohl, Robert Downey Jr., Sarah Silverman, Jeff Bridges, Jackson Browne, Jessica Chastain and Tony Hawk, among others.

Season 1
Season 1 of Off Camera premiered on DirecTV in February 2014. It featured Sam Jones in conversation with the following guests.

 1. Val McCallum
 2. John Krasinski
 3. Blake Mills 
 4. Aimee Mann
 5. Robert Downey Jr.
 6. Tony Hawk
 7. Dave Grohl
 8. Judd Apatow
 9. Laura Dern
 10. Stacy Peralta
 11. Martin Short
 12. Will Forte
 13. Michael B. Jordan

Season 2
Season 2 of Off Camera premiered on DirecTV in the Fall of 2014. It featured Sam Jones in conversation with the following guests.

 14. Sarah Silverman
 15. Matt Damon
 16. Ed Helms
 17. Jackson Browne
 18. Judy Greer
 19. Jeff Bridges
 20. Taylor Goldsmith
 21. Laird Hamilton
 22. Jon Brion
 23. Jason Sudeikis
 24. Chris Pine
 25. Jessica Chastain

Season 3
Season 3 of Off Camera premiered on DirecTV in March 2015. It featured Sam Jones in conversation with the following guests.

 26. Will Ferrell
 27. Ethan Hawke
 28. Jon Hamm
 29. Lake Bell
 30. Jennifer Beals
 31. Zach Braff
 32. Lizzy Caplan
 33. Chris Moore
 34. Rashida Jones
 35. Kevin Bacon
 36. Dax Shepard

Season 4
Season 4 of Off Camera premiered on DirecTV on September 21, 2015. It featured Sam Jones in conversation with the following guests.

 37. Jake Gyllenhaal
 38. Cindy Crawford
 39. Elliot Page
 40. Tatiana Maslany
 41. Olivia Wilde
 42. Jack Black
 43. Carrie Brownstein
 44. Connie Britton
 45. William H. Macy
 46. Joseph Gordon-Levitt
 47. Paul Dano
 48. Bill Lawrence
 49. Linda Cardellini
 50. Aubrey Plaza
 51. Tim Robbins
 52. Matt Berninger

Season 5
Season 5 of Off Camera premiered on DirecTV on March 7, 2016. It featured Sam Jones in conversation with the following guests.

 53. Joanne Froggatt
 54. Dan Patrick
 55. Michelle Monaghan
 56. Don Cheadle
 57. Kristen Bell
 58. Richard Linklater
 59. Bob Odenkirk
 60. Titus Welliver
 61. Glen Hansard
 62. The Edge
 63. Krysten Ritter
 64. Keegan-Michael Key
 65. Kathryn Hahn
 66. Imogen Poots
 67. Thomas Middleditch
 68. Luke Wilson

Season 6
Season 6 of Off Camera premiered on DirecTV on September 12, 2016. It featured Sam Jones in conversation with the following guests.

 69. Todd Phillips
 70. Adam Scott
 71. Vince Vaughn
 72. Mindy Kaling
 73. Kate Beckinsale
 74. Nick Offerman
 75. Ewan McGregor
 76. Mark Duplass
 77. Thandie Newton
 78. Mike Colter
 79. Rob Lowe
 80. Mackenzie Davis
 81. Michael Shannon
 82. Riz Ahmed
 83. Andrew Garfield
 84. Greta Gerwig

Season 7
Season 7 of Off Camera premiered on DirecTV on January 9, 2017, featuring Sam Jones in conversation with the following guests.

 85. Rachel Bloom
 86. Aaron Paul
 87. Ricky Carmichael
 88. Elijah Wood
 89. David Oyelowo
 90. Kenneth Lonergan
 91. Sam Richardson
 92. Gillian Jacobs
 93. Jerrod Carmichael
 94. Maggie Siff
 95. Hank Azaria
 96. Courteney Cox
 97. Jenny Slate
 98. Freida Pinto
 99. Matt Walsh
 100. Ron Howard
 101. Colin Hanks
 102. Elisabeth Moss
 103. Chris Shiflett
 104. Billy Crudup
 105. Danny McBride
 106. Jim Jefferies
 107. Sam Elliott
 108. Kumail Nanjiani
 109. Zoe Lister-Jones
 110. Zoe Kazan
 111. Michaela Watkins
 112. Lauren Lapkus
 113. Holly Hunter

Season 8
Season 8 of Off Camera premiered on DirecTV on May 1, 2017, featuring Sam Jones in conversation with the following guests.

 114. Mike White
 115. Jay Duplass
 116. Alan Tudyk
 117. Tom Papa
 118. Nick Kroll
 119. Chadwick Boseman
 120. Willem Dafoe
 121. Rebecca Hall
 122. Emmy Rossum
 123. Michael Connelly
 124. Pamela Adlon
 125. Jeff Daniels
 126. Sam Rockwell
 127. Octavia Spencer
 128. John Doe
 129. Neil Patrick Harris

Season 9
Season 9 of Off Camera premiered on DirecTV on September 25, 2017, featuring Sam Jones in conversation with the following guests.

 130. Pete Holmes
 131. Diane Kruger
 132. Jenna Fischer
 133. Danai Gurira
 134. Common
 135. Taylor Kitsch
 136. Jason Katims
 137. Andie MacDowell
 138. Bill Hader
 139. Dan Stevens
 140. John Goodman
 141. Zach Woods
 142. Mae Whitman
 143. Josh Radnor
 144. Christina Hendricks 
 145. Jason Isbell 
 146. John Mulaney
 147. Peter Krause 
 148. Natasha Leggero
 149. Sarah Paulson
 150. Rachel Brosnahan
 151. Alison Brie 
 152. Keri Russell 
 153. Betty Gilpin

Season 10
Season 10 of Off Camera premiered on DirecTV on June 11, 2018, featuring Sam Jones in conversation with the following guests.

 154. Rose Byrne
 155. Chris O'Dowd 
 156. Awkwafina 
 157. Uzo Aduba 
 158. Paul Feig 
 159. Chris Messina 
 160. Elizabeth Olsen 
 161. Eric Idle 
 162. Javier Bardem 
 163. Sissy Spacek
 164. Mary Elizabeth Winstead  
 165. Ryan Bingham
 166. Hasan Minhaj 
 167. Rosamund Pike 
 168. Matt Damon 
 169. Bo Burnham
 170. Carey Mulligan
 171. Ted Danson
 172. Emily Mortimer 
 173. Steve Coogan 
 174. Ron Livingston

Season 11
Season 11 of Off Camera premiered on DirecTV on November 26, 2018, featuring Sam Jones in conversation with the following guests.

 175. D'Arcy Carden
 176. Dax Shepard 
 177. Regina Hall 
 178. Stephen Merchant
 179. Daniel Radcliffe
 180. Norman Reedus 
 181. Patton Oswalt 
 182. Ray Romano 
 183. Lauren Cohan
 184. Brit Marling
 185. Joey King
 186. David Harbour
 187. Busy Philipps
 188. Seth Rogen
 189. "Weird Al" Yankovic
 190. Sarah Goldberg 
 191. Jason Mantzoukas
 192. Andrew Bird
 193. Ian McShane
 194. Fred Armisen
 195. Olivia Wilde
 196. Sienna Miller
 197. David Tennant
 198. Ramy Youssef
 199. Scoot McNairy
 200. Robert Downey Jr.

Season 12
Season 12 of Off Camera premiered on DirecTV on August 19, 2019, featuring Sam Jones in conversation with the following guests.

 201. Jason Sudeikis 
 202. Wyatt Russell 
 203. Constance Wu 
 204. Andrea Savage 
 205. Scott Aukerman
 206. Zach Galifianakis
 207. Beth Behrs 
 208. Adam DeVine 
 209. Jake Johnson 
 210. Jeff Bridges
 211. Edward Norton 
 212. Lance Reddick 
 213. Noomi Rapace
 214. Josh Gad
 215. Tracy Letts 
 216. Jenny Slate
 217. Mike McGill and Steve Caballero
 218. Liz Phair
 219. Year-end Holiday Wrap-up Show

References

2010s American comedy television series
2014 American television series debuts
English-language television shows
Television shows set in Los Angeles